As God Commands is a 2008 Italian drama film directed by Gabriele Salvatores, based on novel of the same name by Niccolò Ammaniti. It was entered into the 31st Moscow International Film Festival.

Cast
 Filippo Timi as Rino Zena
 Elio Germano as Quattro Formaggi
 Alvaro Caleca as Cristiano Zena
 Angelica Leo as Fabiana
 Fabio De Luigi as Trecca
 Alessandro Mizzi as Uomo SUV
 Corinna Agustoni as Maria Pirro
 Alessandro Bressanello as Marchetta
 Ludovica Di Rocco as Esmeralda
 Valentina Sussi as Ragazza Centro Sociale
 Andrea De Nori as Alex

References

External links
 

2008 films
2008 drama films
2000s Italian-language films
Italian drama films
Films directed by Gabriele Salvatores
2000s Italian films